Egli Trimi (born 13 June 1993) is an Albanian football player, who played as a forward for Besa Kavajë football club.

References

External links
 Profile - FSHF
 

1993 births
Living people
Footballers from Kavajë
Albanian footballers
Association football forwards
Besa Kavajë players
Kategoria Superiore players